Barrie Kerr (born 30 January 1938) is a former Australian rules footballer who played for the Footscray Football Club in the Victorian Football League (VFL).

Notes

External links 
		

Living people
1938 births
Australian rules footballers from Victoria (Australia)
Western Bulldogs players